Humad (or Humbad) is the name of an ancient Jain community originally from Gujarat and Rajasthan, India. Their traditional center is Pratapgarh, Rajasthan, Dungarpur and Sagwada region, often called Vagad (or Raidesh),  in Rajasthan.

See also

Banswara

References

Jain communities
Jainism in India
Social groups of Rajasthan